John W. Mokosak (born September 7, 1963) is a Canadian former professional ice hockey player who played 41 games in the National Hockey League for the Detroit Red Wings during the 1988–89 and 1989–90 seasons. The rest of his career, which lasted from 1983 to 1993, was spent in the minor leagues. John is the brother of Carl Mokosak.

Career statistics

Regular season and playoffs

External links
 

1963 births
Living people
Adirondack Red Wings players
Binghamton Rangers players
Binghamton Whalers players
Canadian expatriate ice hockey players in the United States
Canadian ice hockey defencemen
Detroit Red Wings players
Fort Saskatchewan Traders players
Hartford Whalers draft picks
Maine Mariners players
Phoenix Roadrunners (IHL) players
Salt Lake Golden Eagles (IHL) players
Ice hockey people from Edmonton
Springfield Indians players
Victoria Cougars (WHL) players